Pseudonomoneura is a genus of mydas flies (insects in the family Mydidae). There are about seven described species in Pseudonomoneura.

Species
These seven species belong to the genus Pseudonomoneura:
 Pseudonomoneura bajaensis Fitzgerald & Kondratieff, 1995 c g
 Pseudonomoneura calderwoodi Fitzgerald & Kondratieff, 1997 c g
 Pseudonomoneura californica (Hardy, 1950) i c g b
 Pseudonomoneura hirta (Coquillett, 1904) i c g b
 Pseudonomoneura micheneri (James, 1938) i c g b
 Pseudonomoneura nelsoni Fitzgerald & Kondratieff, 1995 c g b
 Pseudonomoneura tinkhami (Hardy, 1950) i c g b
Data sources: i = ITIS, c = Catalogue of Life, g = GBIF, b = Bugguide.net

References

Further reading

 

Mydidae
Articles created by Qbugbot
Asiloidea genera